October in Kragujevac Memorial Park (Спомен-парк „Крагујевачки октобар"), also known as Šumarice Memorial Park (Memorijalni park Šumarice, Меморијални парк Шумарице), is the site near Kragujevac, Serbia of the execution of an estimated 2,800 men and boys of the town by the German occupation forces on October 21, 1941, during World War II (Kragujevac massacre). Among the dead were hundreds of high school students. The 21 October Museum was designed by architect Ivan Antić is located at the site of the massacre.

Monuments within the park include the monument to the murdered schoolchildren and their teachers (the "Interrupted Flight" monument) by sculptor Miodrag Živković; the "Monument of pain and defiance" by sculptor Ante Gržetić; the "One hundred for one" monument by Nandor Glid; the "Resistance and Freedom" monument by Gržetić; and the Shoeshiners monument ("Crystal Flower") by architect Nebojša Delja. The complex also contains the Monument to the Slovaks killed during the World War I and the old World War I military cemetery with a Monument to Serbian soldier.

In December 2020 an exhibit about the Jasenovac concentration and extermination camp was held.

Gallery

See also
List of Yugoslav World War II monuments and memorials in Serbia
 Historic Landmarks of Exceptional Importance

References

External links

 Šumarice Memorial Park - Museum of October 21
 Virtual tour to area, monuments and buildings

Kragujevac
Parks in Serbia
World War II monuments and memorials in Serbia
Museums in Serbia
Museum districts
Historic Landmarks of Exceptional Importance